Andrew Arthur Miller (born 10 July 1966) is a British accountant and business executive. He was the chief executive officer of the Guardian Media Group from 2010 to 2015. He previously served as Chief Financial Officer of the Trader Media Group from 2004 to 2009, and of the Guardian Media Group from 2009 to 2010.

References

 

 
 
 

1966 births
Living people
British accountants
British chief executives
Place of birth missing (living people)
Chief financial officers